Anne Suinner-Lawoyin (born Anne Titilope Suinner, September 4, 1981) is a former Most Beautiful Girl in Nigeria, and currently a businesswoman. 

Suinner-Lawoyin was born to the family of Patrick M. Suinner, hailing from Takum local council, Taraba State. She placed second in MBGN 2001, but replaced Agbani Darego after the latter was crowned Miss World. Suinner-Lawoyin, who had represented Abuja at MBGN, later revealed she had never intended to participate in the contest but relented after pageant organisers persuaded her when she accompanied a friend to the screening. As reigning MBGN, Suinner-Lawoyin worked on several projects, including Sickle Cell Awareness.

After reigning for five months, Suinner-Lawoyin returned to the Olabisi Onabanjo University, graduating with a Philosophy degree, and was a presenter with M-NET. Now married, she resides in America where she studied Nursing at the University of North Carolina, and launched an organic skincare brand, Anne's Apothecary, as part of her mission to reduce daily life toxins following the loss of her mother to lung cancer.

References

Living people
1981 births
Nigerian emigrants to the United States
Nigerian beauty pageant winners
American people of Yoruba descent
Olabisi Onabanjo University alumni
UNC School of Nursing alumni